The 2015 Bryant Bulldogs football team represented Bryant University during the 2015 NCAA Division I FCS football season. They were led by twelfth year head coach Marty Fine and played their home games at Bulldog Stadium. They were a member of the Northeast Conference. They finished the season 5–6, 3–3 in NEC play to finish in a three way tie for third place.

Previous season
In 2014, Bryant finished with a record of 8–3, 4–2 in NEC play, to finish in third place. They failed to qualify for the 2014 FCS Playoffs.

Schedule

Game summaries

American International

Brown

Coastal Carolina

Monmouth

Central Connecticut

Duquesne

Saint Francis (PA)

Holy Cross

Wagner

Sacred Heart

Robert Morris

References

Bryant
Bryant Bulldogs football seasons
Bryant Bulldogs football